The 1989 Overseas Final was the ninth running of the Overseas Final as part of the qualification for the 1989 Speedway World Championship Final to be held in Munich, West Germany. The 1989 Final was held at the Brandon Stadium in Coventry, England on 25 June and was the second last qualifying round for Commonwealth and American riders.

The Top 9 riders qualified for the Intercontinental Final to be held in Bradford, England.

1989 Overseas Final
25 June
 Coventry, Brandon Stadium
Qualification: Top 9 plus 1 reserve to the Intercontinental Final in Bradford, England

* Rick Miller replaced Shawn Moran. Bobby Schwartz came in as the reserve rider

References

See also
 Motorcycle Speedway

1989
World Individual